Marimar is a Philippine television drama romance series broadcast by GMA Network. The series is based on a 1994 Mexican television series of the same title. Directed by Dominic Zapata, Mark Dela Cruz and Lore Reyes, it stars Megan Young in the title role and Tom Rodriguez. It premiered on August 24, 2015 on the network's Telebabad line up replacing Pari 'Koy. The series concluded on January 8, 2016 with a total of 100 episodes. It was replaced by That's My Amboy in its timeslot.

Premise
Marimar is a beautiful poor girl who marries the handsome and rich heir, Sergio. Unfortunately, Sergio's stepmother Angelika and ex-girlfriend Antonia makes Marimar's life a "living hell". A few years later, Marimar meets her wealthy biological father, Gustavo Aldama, who helps her get revenge against the people who wronged her.

Cast and characters

Lead cast
 Megan Young as Marimar Pérez-Santibañez / Bella Aldama-Santibañez
 Tom Rodriguez as Sergio Santibañez

Supporting cast
 Jaclyn Jose as Angelika Santibañez
 Lauren Young as Antonia Santibañez
 Alice Dixson as Mia Corcuera-Aldama
 Zoren Legaspi as Gustavo Aldama
 Ina Raymundo as Brenda Guillermo
 Carmi Martin as Tía Esperanza Corcuera
 Ricardo Cepeda as Renato Santibañez
 Cris Villanueva as Sito Porres
 Dion Ignacio as Nicandro Mejía
 Jaya Ramsey as Tía Corazón
 Candy Pangilinan as Tía Perfecta 
 Boobay as Fulgoso's voice
 Princess as Fulgoso
 Ashley Cabrera as Cruzita A. Santibañez 
 Zach Briz as Panchito A. Santibañez

Recurring cast
 Diva Montelaba as Kendra Dela Paz 
 Princess Snell as Aurora Santibañez 
 James Blanco as Rodolfo San Jinez
 Solenn Heussaff as Capuccina Blanchett
 Maricris Garcia as Natalia Montenegro 
 Diana Zubiri as Julianna Corcuera-Aldama 
 Mikoy Morales as Choi del Castillo
 Rita Iringan as Vanessa Mejia 
 LJ Reyes as Inocencia Corcuera-Arcega
 Carlene Aguilar as Gilma "Gema" Cascavel
 Arny Ross as Amale Zamora / fake Bella 
 Alicia Mayer as Adina San Jose
 Glenda Garcia as Gracia Zamora
 Iwa Moto as Magda Evangelista
 Frank Magalona as Franco Santibañez 
 Shey Reyes as Carinda Corcuera
 Jess Lapid as Ramon
 Pekto as Eliong

Guest cast
 Vincent Magbanua as young Choi
 Lito Legaspi as Fernando Aldama
 Baby O'Brien as Lupita Aldama
 Nova Villa as lola Cruz Pérez
 Tommy Abuel as lolo Pancho Pérez
 Annalie Forbes as Maricar
 Hazel Dio as teen Marimar
 Elijah Alejo as young Marimar
 Barbara Miguel as young Amale
 Almira Muhlach as Ysabel Santibañez
 Beatriz Imperial as Katja Perez
 Carl Acosta as young Sergio

Background
The show is GMA Network's second television adaptation of the Televisa telenovela which was led by Thalía. In 2007, GMA Network acquired the rights to remake Marimar and Marian Rivera was given to play title role, while Dingdong Dantes portrayed the role of her love interest Sergio.

The second adaptation of Marimar is Megan Young's first lead acting role after winning Miss World in 2013. This was her comeback project in GMA Network after leaving in 2007.

Ratings
According to AGB Nielsen Philippines' Mega Manila household television ratings, the pilot episode of Marimar earned a 25.1% rating. While the final episode scored a 24.8% rating. The series had its highest rating on November 10, 2015 with a 27.1% rating.

References

External links
 

2015 Philippine television series debuts
2016 Philippine television series endings
Filipino-language television shows
GMA Network drama series
Philippine romance television series
Philippine television series based on Mexican television series
Philippine television series based on telenovelas
Television series reboots
Television shows set in Paris
Television shows set in the Philippines